Beefy may refer to:

 Beef, meat obtained from bovines, or related concepts.
 A flavour of Seabrook Potato Crisps
 Ian Botham, an English cricketer nicknamed "Beefy"
 Beefy, a fictional character in the novel The Beastly Beatitudes of Balthazar B
 Beefy (artist), the stage name of Keith Alan Moore, a Nerdcore hip hop artist
 Beefy Dan, a fictional character in the British comic The Beezer
 Beefy Jones, a novel by English author Eric Malpass
 Beefy Louis, a fictional character on the American television show The Sinbad Show
 Beefy Smith, a fictional character in the Disney film Follow Me, Boys!